Mikkel Dobloug (born 7 July 1944) is a Norwegian Nordic combined skier.

He was born at Vang, and represented the club Vang Skiløperforening. He competed at the 1968 Winter Olympics in Grenoble, where he placed 21st in the individual Nordic combined. He became Norwegian champion in individual Nordic combined in 1966.

References

1944 births
Living people
Sportspeople from Hamar
Nordic combined skiers at the 1968 Winter Olympics
Norwegian male Nordic combined skiers
Olympic Nordic combined skiers of Norway
20th-century Norwegian people